Daniela Greene is a German-raised American woman, who worked as translator for the Federal Bureau of Investigation. She later travelled to ISIL-occupied Syria to become an ISIL bride.

Biography
Greene was born in Czechoslovakia but raised in Germany.  She became an American citizen after marrying Matthew Greene, then serving in the US Armed Services in Germany, earning a bachelor's degree in Oklahoma, and a master's degree in history at Clemson University in 2008.

Alan Grubb, her thesis supervisor, described her as one of his best students.  Several years after her graduation, he wrote letters of recommendation that helped her get a job as a contract linguist with the FBI in 2011.

In 2014, the FBI was conducting a covert investigation into Denis Cuspert. As part of that investigation, Greene was assigned to communicate with him over Skype.

Unknown to her FBI superiors, Greene used an additional Skype account to communicate with Cuspert.  Greene told her FBI superiors she was going to use a vacation to visit relatives back in Germany, when in reality she had used her third, unauthorized Skype account to plan to meet Cuspert in ISIL-occupied Syria.  She told her FBI supervisors that she was leaving for Germany on June 11, 2014, and would return to Detroit on July 4, but actually travelled to ISIL-territory via Turkey instead.

Greene married Cuspert in ISIL-occupied Syria.  CNN reported that Greene realized she had made a mistake within weeks of her arrival and found a way to return to the US, knowing she would face arrest and imprisonment.  Commentators do not know how she was able to escape ISIL when many other people were not able to escape.

Greene was arrested, cooperated, and pleaded guilty. CNN reported that her charge and sentence was considerably lighter than those of other Americans who had merely made unsuccessful attempts to travel to ISIL territory.  CNN quoted speculation that prosecutors asked for a light sentence to reward her for her cooperation.

Greene was released after serving a two-year sentence and relocated to Syracuse, New York, where she found employment as a hostess at a hotel.

In 2019, when ISIL's last enclave was collapsing, Greene was compared to Hoda Muthana, an Alabama widow who had married a Jihadi fighter and then escaped to a refugee camp, and was determined to have never had US citizenship.

References

1980 births
Living people
21st-century American women
American translators
Clemson University alumni
Federal Bureau of Investigation
Czechoslovak emigrants to the United States
Islamic State of Iraq and the Levant members
People with acquired American citizenship
Czech Muslims
Converts to Islam
American Muslims